Thomas Tudor Tucker (June 25, 1745May 2, 1828) was a Bermuda-born American physician and politician representing Charleston, South Carolina. He was elected from South Carolina in both the Continental Congress and the U.S. House. He later was appointed as Treasurer of the United States and served from 1801 to his death in 1828, establishing a record as the longest-serving Treasurer.

Biography
Thomas was born in St. George's, Bermuda to a family prominent in that colony since his ancestors emigrated from England in 1662. His parents were Henry and  Ann Tucker. As a youth, Thomas studied medicine at the University of Edinburgh in Scotland. After graduating in 1770, he moved first to Virginia in the 1760s, then settled in Charleston, South Carolina (which had been settled from Bermuda in 1670, under the leadership of William Sayle, and which had a large community of expatriate Bermudians) and opened a practice. His younger brother St. George Tucker followed him to Virginia, studying law and eventually being appointed as Chief Justice of the Virginia Supreme Court.

Tucker was an early supporter of the cause of American independence. He was elected to the South Carolina House of Representatives in 1776, and served there in various years until 1788. In 1781 he joined the Continental Army as a hospital surgeon supporting the Southern Department, and served until 1783. South Carolina sent him as a delegate to the Continental Congress in 1787 and again in 1788. He is believed to have played a key role in a plot to supply the rebel army with gunpowder stolen from a British magazine in his Bermudian homeland.

In 1775, after the Battle of Lexington, the Continental Congress announced a trade embargo against British colonies remaining loyal to the Crown. Bermuda, with its control of the Turks Islands, and a large merchant fleet, offered to supply the Patriots with salt, but they were unimpressed and asked for gunpowder. Meanwhile, in June 1775, the fiercely loyal Governor of Bermuda, George James Bruere, who had lost one of his sons, John, who was killed fighting on the British side at the Battle of Bunker Hill, was enraged when, on August 14, Bermudians sympathetic to the Revolution stole the island's supply of gunpowder from the Powder Magazine in St George's and shipped it to the rebels. Trade with Bermuda developed, for which Bruere was not blamed in London.

This was despite the implication of his Bermudian relatives in the act of treason. The President of the Governor's Council, and occasional acting Governor of Bermuda, was Bruere's son-in-law, Henry Tucker, who was Thomas T. Tucker's older brother. Most notably, among other prominent Bermudians, their father, a Colonel of the Militia, as well as their brother, St. George Tucker, were believed to have been involved in organising the theft. Thomas Tudor Tucker is believed to have suggested that George Washington write the letter, addressed to the people of Bermuda, which had sparked the act of treason, and that it had been delivered into the hands of his relatives in Bermuda. The plot was organised by persons highly-enough placed that no one was ever prosecuted.

The letter from Washington had read:

Tucker was opposed to the United States Constitution, believing that it gave too much authority to the central government. He was elected to the United States House of Representatives and served in the first two congresses from 1789 until 1793.

On December 1, 1801 President Jefferson appointed Tucker as Treasurer of the United States. He held that post through four administrations (Jefferson, Madison, Monroe, and J.Q. Adams), serving until his death in 1828. Tucker holds the record as the longest-serving Treasurer: 26 years, 153 days. During this time, he also served as physician to President Madison (1809–1817).

Tucker died while in office at Washington, D.C. and is buried in the Congressional Cemetery. His nephew, Henry St. George Tucker, Sr., was a U.S. Congressman from Virginia. His nephew Thomas Tudor Tucker stayed with the Bermuda branch of the family and served as an admiral in the British Navy.

Works
Tucker published an oration that was delivered in Charleston before the South Carolina Society of the Cincinnati (Charleston, 1795).

References

External links

 

1745 births
1828 deaths
Continental Congressmen from South Carolina
18th-century American politicians
Members of the United States House of Representatives from South Carolina
Treasurers of the United States
Physicians in the American Revolution
Burials at the Congressional Cemetery
Thomas Tudor Tucker
American people of English descent
Alumni of the University of Edinburgh